The term Carthaginian usually refers to a citizen of Ancient Carthage.

It can also refer to:
 Carthaginian (ship), a three-masted schooner built in 1921
 Insurgent privateers; nineteenth-century South American privateers, particularly those hailing from Cartagena, Colombia, and flying the insurgent flag were often called "Carthaginians" in the contemporary British and American press. Occasionally 19th century vessels in the Mediterranean hailing from Cartagena, Spain, too might be referred to as "Carthaginian".